Huawei Mate 40 , Huawei Mate 40 Pro , Huawei Mate 40 Pro Plus and Huawei Mate 40 RS Porsche Design is a high-end Android and HarmonyOS based phablets developed by Huawei for its Mate series, succeeding the Huawei Mate 30 range. They were released on October 22, 2020 at Huawei's Online Global Launch Event.

Design 

The Mate 40 and Mate 40 Pro are constructed with an anodized aluminum frame and Gorilla Glass or artificial leather backing. The Mate 40 Pro+ uses ceramic for both the frame and the back. The notch on the Mate 30 series has been replaced by a cutout in the upper left hand corner. The Mate 40 has a circular cutout for the front-facing camera; the Mate 40 Pro and Mate 40 Pro+ have a larger pill-shaped cutout also accommodating the infrared facial recognition system. On the Mate 40 Pro and Mate 40 Pro+, the screen is dramatically curved like the Mate 30 Pro, but has physical volume buttons. Unlike the P40 series, the Mate 40 series uses a traditional earpiece speaker instead of an "electromagnetic levitation" speaker that vibrates the top of the phone's screen; the top edge has an IR blaster. The rear camera setup of the three main phones is housed in a distinct ring shape, called the Space Ring camera system, which Huawei says represents "a window to explore the world." The Space Ring camera system is similar to their predecessor, the Mate 30. The center of the ring is the same glass and color as the rest of the back, and the cameras and dual flash are arranged within the ring, with the flash being on top on all of the models. The Mate 40 and Mate 40 Pro are available in Mystic Silver, White and Black (glass), and Green and Yellow (artificial leather). The Mate 40 Pro+ is available in Ceramic White or Ceramic Black. Additionally, all Mate 40 models have an IP68 rating, apart from Mate 40 which has an IP53 rating.

Specifications

Hardware

Chipset 
The Mate 40 series is powered by the Kirin 9000 and Kirin 9000E, which are HiSilicon's first 5nm SoC's based on TSMCˋs 5nm FinFET (EUV) technology. The Mate 40 uses the Kirin 9000E, which has less GPU and NPU cores. Both system-on-chips allow for standard 5G connectivity, however only "sub-6" is available, meaning the Mate 40 series is not compatible with ultra-fast millimeter wave (mmWave) networks.

Display 
All of the Mate 40 models have an OLED Horizon Display, with curved glass on either side of the display that wraps 68° around the edge on the Mate 40 and 88° around the edge on the others. Collectively, the phones have a 90Hz display with a 240Hz touch sampling rate. The Mate 40 has a  display with a  resolution, ~402 ppi density, and a ~89.3% screen-to-body ratio.

Battery 
The Mate 40 has a 4,200 mAh lithium polymer battery, while all of the other models had 4,400 mAh battery. The Mate 40 supports 40 W fast charging, while the others support 66 W fast charging. The others also support 50 W wireless charging and 5 W reverse wireless charging.

Storage 
All three phone models have UFS 3.1 storage in varying amounts. The Mate 40 has 2 storage configurations, 128 or 256 GB, with 8 GB RAM in both. The Mate 40 Pro has 256 GB of storage and 8 GB of RAM, while the Mate 40 Pro+ has 256 as well but 12 GB of RAM. The Mate 40 RS Porsche Design has the most storage and RAM with 512 GB and 12 GB, respectively. All of the model's storage can be expanded via Huawei's proprietary Nano Memory, up to 256 GB in addition to the internal storage.

Camera 
The Huawei Mate 40 series features Leica optics with similar cameras to the P40. The Mate 40 has a total of 3 cameras: a 50 MP f/1.9 RYYB wide main camera, an 8 MP f/2.4 3X telephoto camera, a 16 MP f/2.2 ultrawide camera. The Mate 40 Pro has a similar triple-camera setup, with arranged in identical manner. The setup consists of a 50 MP f/1.9 wide main camera, same as the Mate 40, a higher resolution 12 MP f/3.4 periscope telephoto and a higher resolution 20 MP ultrawide camera. The Mate 40 Pro+ has a Penta-camera setup, meaning it has 5 separate rear cameras. It has a 50 MP f/1.9 wide, just like the two lower-end models but with OIS, a 12 MP f/2.4 telephoto lens, an 8 MP f/4.4 periscope telephoto lens, capable of up to 10x optical zoom, a industry-first free-form lens 20 MP f/2.4 ultrawide for less distortion, and ToF depth sensor. 
The luxury model, the Mate 40 RS Porsche Design, carries the same penta-camera setup as the Mate 40 Pro+ just without free-form ultrawide. But, design-wise, lacks the Space Ring, instead opting for a large, octagonal protrusion without an opening in the center.

All of the phones' main cameras are capable of video up to 4K resolution at up to 60 frames per second (fps). The main sensors are also equipped with laser autofocus. The Mate 40 Pro and Pro+ can shoot slow motion at up to 3840 fps while the Mate 40 only goes up to 960 fps.

Software 
The Mate 40 series come with Android 10 and Huawei's software overlay, EMUI 11. Due to US restrictions, no Google apps, including the Google Play Store, are preloaded or downloadable on any of the Mate 40 phones. The Mate 40 series support Huawei Mobile Services uses Huawei AppGallery as its main app store.

See also 
 Huawei Mate 30
 Huawei Mate 50
 List of Huawei phones

References

External links 

 
 Huawei Website for Mate 40 Pro
 Huawei Website for Mate 40 Pro Options

Huawei smartphones
Mobile phones introduced in 2020
Android (operating system) devices
Mobile phones with multiple rear cameras
Mobile phones with 4K video recording
Mobile phones with infrared transmitter
Discontinued smartphones